The 14th Northwest Territories Legislative Assembly was the 22nd assembly of the territorial government. This assembly lasted from 1999 until its dissolution in 2003. This was the first assembly in the new Northwest Territories that was split in half to create Nunavut. As a result of division membership dropped from 24 to 19 seats with the political map being radically altered.

References

External links
Northwest Territories Legislative Assembly homepage

Northwest Territories Legislative Assemblies